Robert Crosbie Burns (24 June 1900 – 10 August 1993) was a New Zealand cricketer who played first-class cricket for Canterbury between 1928 and 1934.

Burns was a wicket-keeper. In Canterbury's match against Otago in the 1928-29 Plunket Shield he made five stumpings, all of them off the bowling of Bill Merritt. He served on the committee of the Canterbury Cricket Association for many years before he moved to Auckland in 1939.

Burns worked in insurance. He served in the New Zealand Army in World War II as a private. At the time of his death at the age of 93 he was New Zealand's oldest first-class cricketer.

References

External links
 
Bob Burns at CricketArchive

1900 births
1993 deaths
New Zealand cricketers
Canterbury cricketers